Diuris striata is a poorly-known species of orchid that is endemic to New South Wales. It has a two grass-like leaves and about four mauve flowers with dark purple streaks on the labellum.

Description
Flowering has only been observed in November.

Taxonomy and naming
Diuris striata was first formally described in 1944 by Herman Rupp and the description was published in his book The Orchids of New South Wales. Rupp noted "No specimens are known and the following brief description is quoted from Moore and Betche's Handbook: [Handbook of the flora of New South Wales : a description of the flowering plants and ferns indigenous to New South Wales] "Flowers lilac. Petals ovate-lanceolate. Lateral lobes of the labellum short, acute, recurved, the middle lobe broadly spathulate. Flowers not blotched, but the labellum barred with darker lines". The specific epithet (striata) is derived from the Latin word meaning stria meaning "furrow", "channel" or "stripe".

Distribution
This orchid is only known from the type collection made near Forbes before 1889.

References

striata
Endemic orchids of Australia
Orchids of New South Wales
Plants described in 1944
Taxa named by Herman Rupp